Albert Webber Preston (June 26, 1926 – September 21, 1979) was an American Negro league pitcher in the 1940s.

A native of New York, New York, Preston played for the New York Black Yankees in 1943 and again in 1947. In 1950, he played minor league baseball for the Elmwood Giants of the Mandak League. Preston died in New York City in 1979 at age 53.

References

External links
 and Seamheads

1926 births
1979 deaths
New York Black Yankees players
20th-century African-American sportspeople
Stamford Bombers players